WFTR is a sports formatted broadcast radio station licensed to Front Royal, Virginia, serving Front Royal and Warren County, Virginia.  WFTR is owned and operated by Royal Broadcasting, Inc.

History
WFTR began broadcasting September 19, 1948, as a Mutual affiliate on 1450 kHz, with 250 watts of power.  The station was, at the time, licensed to the Sky-Park Broadcasting Corporation.

References

External links
Sports Radio 1450 WFTR on Facebook

1948 establishments in Virginia
Sports radio stations in the United States
Radio stations established in 1948
FTR
Front Royal, Virginia